The Order of Katonga is the highest military decoration of the Ugandan Honours System. It is a very rare award that recognises its recipients for extraordinary heroism.

History
The order is named after the final and decisive battle of the National Resistance Army during the Ugandan Bush War. It was fought near the Katonga River.

Ugandan President Yoweri Museveni decorated the Libyan leader Muammar Gaddafi on 6 April 2004 in Tripoli, honouring him for his contribution to the National Resistance Army (NRA) bush struggle that liberated Uganda from dictatorship, adding that Colonel Gaddaffi has always been at the forefront of the liberation of Africa and unification of the continent.

Museveni also posthumously awarded former Tanzanian President Julius Nyerere in July 2007 at his hometown of Butiama for his assistance in liberating Africa from colonialism in general and Uganda from Idi Amin's rule in particular via the Uganda–Tanzania War. His wife Maria received the award on his behalf.

Recipients

References

External links
 Photograph of the award ceremony at Haki Ngowi Blog

Orders, decorations, and medals of Uganda
Awards established in 2004
2004 establishments in Uganda